Borders College is a further education institution in the Scottish Borders, Scotland. Its main campus is located in Galashiels. Additionally, the college maintains secondary campuses at Hawick, Tweedbank and Newtown St. Boswells. The college was founded in 1984, by a merger of four pre-existing institutions: the Agricultural Centre at Newtown St. Boswells, Duns Agricultural Centre, Galashiels Technical College, and Henderson Technical College. The Galashiels campus has a Technology Enhanced Care Hub and the Hawick campus has a Science, Technology, Engineering and Maths (STEM) Hub.

Borders College former Principals: Angela Cox (30/01/2017 – 4/09/2022). Elizabeth Anne McIntyre (14/08/2006 – 04/12/2016). Dr Robert Boyd Murray (01/04/1997 – 02/08/2006). Robert Campbell Pearson (16/8/1980 – 31/03/1997). 

Borders College Honorary Fellows: Virginia Grant (2021). Ross Dickinson (2020). Nick Bannerman (2019). Doddie Weir OBE (2018). David Stevenson CBE (2017). Wilma Gunn MBE (2016). Rosamund de la Hey (2015). Catherine Maxwell Stuart (2014). Chris Paterson MBE (2013). Andrew Grant (2012). John Collins (2011). John Alistair Buchan (2010). Gregor Townsend (2009). David A G Kilshaw OBE (2008). Ian Stark OBE (2007). Tony Taylor OBE (2006). Bob Kay CBE (2005). Jill Douglas (2004). Andrew L Tulley MBE JP (2003). Sir David Steel (2002). Sir Archy Kirkwood (2001) Barbara Baker (2000). John Cleland (1999). Keith Geddes CBE (1998).

References

External links

Official Borders College website

Schools in the Scottish Borders
Further education colleges in Scotland
1984 establishments in Scotland
Educational institutions established in 1984